Oh My Goddess may refer to:

Oh My Goddess!, a manga series, original video animations, film, and TV series 
 Ah! My Goddess: The Movie, a 2000 animated film based on the manga
"Oh My Goddess", an episode of Charmed (season 5)

See also
 Goddess (disambiguation)
 Oh My God (disambiguation)
 OMG (disambiguation) for "Oh My Goddess" or "Oh My God"
 AMG (disambiguation) for "Ah My Goddess" or "Ah My God"
Megachu!, anime released in North America as Oh My Sex Goddess, a parody title